"Hand in Hand (Looking for Sweet Inspiration)" is a song by English electronic music group Opus III, released in 1994 as the second single from their second album Guru Mother. It peaked at No. 79 on the UK Singles Chart and No. 14 on the US Billboard Dance Club Songs chart.

Grace version

In 1997, British dance act Grace covered the song and released it as their sixth single, titled as "Hand in Hand", on Paul Oakenfold's Perfecto label. It reached number 38 on the UK Singles Chart, number 32 in Scotland and number 85 on the Eurochart Hot 100. Remixes of the song included a complete reworking of the song by Jam El Mar of European dance act Jam & Spoon. Two videos for the song were released, of the Oakenfold and Osborne Radio Mix and an unreleased Eddy Fingers Edit.  The Guardian called it "Grace's strongest single to date", while The Baltimore Sun thought the song had "too much exuberance."

Track listings and formats

Charts

Weekly charts

References

1994 songs
1994 singles
1997 singles
Opus III (band) songs
Grace (group) songs
Perfecto Records singles
East West Records singles